Night Club is a 1989 Italian comedy-drama film co-written and directed by Sergio Corbucci.

Plot
Set on the night Fred Buscaglione died in a car accident, the film tells about two bank clerks who hope to convince a rich businessman from Calabria to finance their enterprise by making him spend an unforgettable night of alcohol and women in a Via Veneto night club.

Cast

Christian De Sica as Walter Danesi 
Mara Venier as Luciana 
 as Commendator Balestrelli
Massimo Wertmüller as Piero Grassi
Sabina Guzzanti as Xandra  
 as Ottavio Volantini
 Elena Parisi as Ilse Nordahl
Sabrina Ferilli as Erina
Claudia Gerini as Cristina
Luciana Turina as the night club owner
Bruno Martino as himsef
Peter Van Wood as himsef

References

External links

1989 films
1980s Italian-language films
Italian comedy-drama films
1980s Italian films